Iván Hernández Rangel (born November 24, 1982) is a Mexican former professional boxer who competed from 2000 to 2013. He held the WBO super flyweight title from 2004 to 2005.

Professional career
In August 2001, Iván won the WBC Youth flyweight title against Juan José Beltrán.

WBO Super Flyweight Championship
At only 22 years old, Hernández won the WBO super flyweight title with an upset knockout over American Mark Johnson in FedEx Forum, Memphis, Tennessee.

He lost his Championship in his first title defense to fellow Mexican Fernando Montiel.

WBO Super Bantamweight Championship
In Hernández's next fight he lost against WBO Super Bantamweight champion Wilfredo Vazquez, Jr.

See also
List of Mexican boxing world champions
List of WBO world champions
List of super flyweight boxing champions

References

External links

Boxers from Mexico City
World Boxing Organization champions
World super-flyweight boxing champions
Super-flyweight boxers
1982 births
Living people
Mexican male boxers